Thiru Nayathode Siva Narayana Temple is located at Nayathod, a small village in Ernakulam District, Kerala, India. The temple is located 3 km from Cochin International Airport. This temple is a protected monument by Archeological Department, Kerala. The deity at this temple is Lord Shiva and Lord Vishnu.

References

Hindu temples in Ernakulam district
Shiva temples in Kerala